The Frankfurter Allee is one of the oldest roads of Berlin, the capital city of Germany. It extends the Karl-Marx-Allee from Frankfurter Tor in the direction of the city of Frankfurt (Oder).

Line  of the city's U-Bahn runs beneath the length of Frankfurter Allee. The U-Bahn stations of Frankfurter Tor, Samariterstraße, Frankfurter Allee, Magdalenenstraße and Lichtenberg are all under or adjacent to the street. Frankfurter Allee and Lichtenberg stations are also served by the city's S-Bahn.

References

Streets in Berlin
Buildings and structures in Friedrichshain-Kreuzberg